Kartikeya Gummakonda (born 21 September 1992) is an Indian actor who predominantly works in Telugu films. He made his acting debut in 2017 with Prematho Mee Karthik and is noted for his performance in the 2018 romantic action film RX100.

He then appeared in films such as Hippi, Guna 369, Nani's Gang Leader and Valimai.

Early and personal life
Kartikeya Gummakonda was born and brought up in Hyderabad. His parents own a school in the neighbourhood of  Vanasthalipuram. After graduating from National Institute of Technology, Warangal,then he choose to pursue a career in acting.

In August 2021, Gummakonda got engaged to his girlfriend Lohitha Reddy whom he met during college days in 2010.

Career
Gummakonda made his debut with Prematho Mee Karthik (2017), and he starred in a few films, none of which ever got theatrically released. He became noted with RX 100 (2018) directed by Ajay Bhupathi. The film was a commercial success which earned him recognition. In the consecutive year, he appeared in films such as Hippi, Guna 369, Nani's Gang Leader and 90ML, with all four releasing in 2019. Gummakonda worked out in order to achieve authenticity in the role of a kickboxer for Hippi. Guna 369 is about a real incident that took place in Ongole. In a review of the film by The Times of India, the reviewer wrote that "Karthikeya does his best to pour life into the titular character". 

Gummakonda made his first appearance as a villain opposite Nani in Gang Leader. He landed the role after the film's director Vikram Kumar liked his acting in RX 100, and he received positive reviews for his portrayal of Dev. Despite enjoying the craze, his intent to evolve as a performer was clearly seen in his antagonist role from Nani's Gang Leader. Post the success of it, he's signed to play an interesting lead role in 90ML. In a review of the film by The Times of India, the reviewer wrote that "Kartikeya gets a role that requires him to dance like a dream and fight like a pro for the most part and he aces it completely." In 2021, he played Basti Balaraju in Chaavu Kaburu Challaga, a hearse driver who falls in love with a widow. Reviewing his performance, a critic from The Indian Express stated: "Kartikeya wins applauds for his depiction of Basthi Balaraju."

In 2021, he starred in Raja Vikramarka where he plays the role of an NIA officer. Gummakonda played the antagonist in the Ajith-starrer Valimai, which marks his debut in Tamil cinema.He'll be next seen in a village dramedy Bedurulanka 2012 which is expected to hit screens in 2023.

Filmography

Films

All films are in Telugu, unless listed otherwise.

Television

Awards and nominations

References

External links

Male actors from Hyderabad, India
Male actors in Telugu cinema
Indian male film actors
Indian male stage actors
21st-century Indian male actors
Living people
Santosham Film Awards winners
Zee Cine Awards winners
1992 births
Telugu male actors